The 2008 Irish Greyhound Derby took place during August and September with the final being held at Shelbourne Park in Dublin on 13 September 2008.

The winner Shelbourne Aston won €175,000 and was trained by Pat Curtin (Ireland), owned by the Curtin-Hehir-Montgomery Syndicate and bred by James Marks. The race was sponsored by the Paddy Power.

Final result 
At Shelbourne, 13 September (over 550 yards):

Distances 
short-head, 1¼, head, head, 4 (lengths)

Competition Report
Defending champion Tyrur Rhino and 2007 runner-up Tyrur Laurel were two of the leading entries for the 2008 Irish Derby. 2008 English Greyhound Derby champion Loyal Honcho only just made the start of the competition after picking up an injury and the other main contenders were listed as Killahan Phanter, College Causeway and Mid West Blue. Tyrur Laurel and Loyal Honcho both sealed early wins but Tyrur Rhino was a shock elimination in round two. Loyal Honcho finished lame signalling the end of two Derby champions’ campaigns.

College Causeway won all three of his rounds but Tyrur Laurel struggled through and Shelbourne Aston came through the back door after finishing fourth and claiming a lucky losers spot. The quarter finals began College Causeway completed a fourth successive win in the quarter finals and Express Ego won at 10-1. The remaining two heats went to Headleys Bridge and Slip the Lark, Tyrur Laurel made it no further.

In the semi-finals Ballymac Ruso won in 29.91 from Machu Picchu and Slip the Lark in the first heat but College Causeway was lacklustre and came in fourth behind Advantage Johnny, Headleys Bridge and Shelbourne Aston in the second heat, Express Ego finished last.

The final was the most open final in Irish Derby history based on the starting prices. Slip the Lark and Advantage Johnny broke best from the traps and remained in the lead around the first two bends closely followed by Ballymac Ruso and a little further back was Headley Bridge. The four all went into the run-in with chances to win the first prize but Shelbourne Aston produced a strong finish and overtook all four to win by a short head.

Quarter finals

Semi finals

See also
2008 UK & Ireland Greyhound Racing Year

References

Greyhound Derby
Irish Greyhound Derby
Irish Greyhound Derby
Irish Greyhound Derby, 2008